Sanjwal Cantonment is a cantonment town in Attock district, Punjab province, Pakistan.

Many workers from the Pakistan Ordnance Factories (POF) reside in this town. This is a small cantonment having an area of 2.5 square Kilometers. This cantonment consist a government housing colony named as Prime Minister Housing colony POF Sanjwal.

References

Cantonments of Pakistan